Aram I (born Bedros Keshishian 8 March 1947), has been the head of the Catholicosate of the Great House of Cilicia since 1995 and he resides in Antelias, Lebanon.

Bibliography
Aram I has written the following books:
 Nerses the Gracious: Theologian and Ecumenist, 1974, Beirut (in Armenian)
 The Witness of the Armenian Church in a Diaspora Situation, 1977, New York (in English), two editions
 The True Image of the Armenian Church, 1979, Antelias (in Armenian)
 With the Will of Re-Building, 1984, Beirut (in Armenian)
 With the People, 1989, Beirut (in Armenian)
 Conciliar Fellowship: a Common Goal, 1989, Geneva (in English), two editions
 Orthodox Perspectives on Mission, 1992, Oxford (in English), two editions
 Towards the 1700th Anniversary of the Christianization of Armenia, 1994, Antelias (in Armenian)
 The Challenge to be a Church in a Changing World, 1997, New York (in English), two editions
 Jesus Christ: the Son of God-the Son of Man, 1999, Antelias (in Armenian), two editions
 Church, Nation and Homeland, 1999, Antelias (in Armenian), two editions
 In Search of Ecumenical Vision, 2000, Antelias (in English), three editions
 L’eglise Face aux Grands défis, 2000, Antelias (in French), two editions
 The Armenian Church Beyond the 1700th Anniversary, 2002, Antelias (in English), three editions
 The Mission of Faith, 2003, Antelias (in Armenian), two editions
 Justice, Paix, Réconciliation, 2003, Antelias  (in French)
 The Christian Witness at the Crossroads in the Middle East, 2004, Antelias (in English), three editions
 Der Zor: A National Sanctuary, 2005, Antelias (in Armenian)
 The Dignity of Serving, 2005, Antelias (in Armenian)
 For a Church Beyond its Walls, 2006, Antelias (in English)
 Pour un Monde Transformé, 2006, Antelias (in French)
 Dialogue with Youth Montreal, 2009 (in English and French)
 Enriching Life with values, Antelias, 2009 (in Armenian)
 St. Nerses the Gracious and Church Unity, Antelias, 2010 (in English)
 A Journey of Faith, Hope and Vision, Antelias, 2011 (in English)
 Taking the Church to the People, Antelias, 2011 (in English)
 Issues and Perspectives, Antelias, 2013 (in English)
 THE ARMENIAN CHURCH. Author: His Holiness Aram I - Antelias, 2016, English, 241 Pages. 
 L’ÉGLISE ARMÉNIENNE. Author: His Holiness Aram I - Antelias, 2018, French,  257 Pages. 
 «Against New Horizons» Author: His Holiness Aram I - Antelias, 2018, 581 Pages
 АРМЯНСКАЯ ЦЕРКОВЬ (ARMENIAN CHURCH), Author: His Holiness Aram I - Antelias, 2018, Russian, 253 Pages.

Inter-religious dialogue
In 2000, he indicated that he had no problem with the substance of Dominus Iesus, the document on relativism of the Holy Office of the Catholic Church, but faulted it for its unecumenical language.

Awards
Baselios MarThoma Didymos I, the Catholicos of the East and Malankara Metropolitan (Primate of the Malankara Orthodox Church), conferred the Order of St. Thomas, the most prestigious honor of the Church, on Aram I on February 27, 2010 at Kolenchery, India.

References

External links

 WCC Press Corner - Biography - Aram I
 WCC moderator H.H. Aram I, opening remarks, 7 June 2005

1947 births
Living people
Religious leaders from Beirut
Aram I of Cilicia
Lebanese people of Armenian descent
Lebanese Oriental Orthodox Christians
Lebanese clergy
Armenian Oriental Orthodox Christians